Time Served is the third studio album by American rapper Moneybagg Yo. It was released on January 10, 2020, through Roc Nation, Collective Music Group, Bread Gang Entertainment, N-Less Entertainment, and Interscope Records. The album features collaborations with Lil Baby, Blac Youngsta, Future, DaBaby, Summer Walker, Fredo Bang, and Megan Thee Stallion. The production on the album was handled by Tay Keith, 30 Roc, and DMacTooBangin, among others. The deluxe edition was released on May 15, 2020, featuring some additional guest appearances from Big Homiie G, Big30, and Rylo Rodriguez.

Release 
Moneybagg Yo first teased the album's release in an Instagram post on December 19, 2019. He later on confirmed the album's title, release date, and track list in now-deleted Instagram posts from January 8 and 9, 2020.

Singles 
"All Dat", a collaboration between himself, and a now-ex-girlfriend and a fellow American rapper Megan Thee Stallion, was released as the album's lead single on October 10, 2019. Its accompanying music video was released on the same day. The song was produced by Denaro Love.

"U Played", a collaboration between himself and a fellow American rapper Lil Baby, was released as the album's second single on January 3, 2020. The song was produced by Tay Keith. An accompanying music video was released on January 13, 2020.

"1 2 3", a collaboration between himself and a fellow American rapper Blac Youngsta, was sent to rhythmic contemporary radio as the third single from the album on April 14, 2020.
 
"Me Vs Me" was released as the lead and only single from the deluxe edition of the album on May 8, 2020.

Commercial performance
Time Served debuted at number three on the US Billboard 200, earning 66,000 album-equivalent units (with 7,000 in pure album sales) in its first week. This became Moneybagg Yo's third US top-ten debut. The album also accumulated a total of 84.1 million on-demand streams for the set’s songs during the week. In its second week, the album fell to number seven on the chart, earning an additional 37,000 units. In its third week, the album fell to number nine on the chart, earning 31,000 more units. On August 18, 2020, the album was certified gold by the Recording Industry Association of America (RIAA) for combined sales and album-equivalent units of over 500,000 units in the United States.

Track listing

Charts

Weekly charts

Year-end charts

Certifications

References

Moneybagg Yo albums
2020 albums
Collective Music Group albums